Hasora hurama, the broad-banded awl, is a butterfly of the family Hesperiidae. It is found in Australia (north-eastern coast of the Northern Territory, the northern Gulf and the north-eastern coast of Queensland), Irian Jaya, Maluku, the Solomon Islands and Papua New Guinea.

The larvae feed on Derris trifoliata. They live in a shelter made by joining leaves with silk.

Subspecies
Hasora hurama hurama
Hasora hurama mola Evans, 1949 (Bacan)

External links
Australian Insects
Australian Faunal Directory

Hesperiidae
Butterflies described in 1870
Butterflies of Oceania
Butterflies of Australia
Taxa named by Arthur Gardiner Butler